St James' Church, Louth is the Anglican parish church of Louth in Lincolnshire, England. It is notable for having the third tallest spire in the whole of the United Kingdom. The church was the site of the Lincolnshire Rising, starting in October 1537 and led by the vicar, who was drawn and quartered for his actions.

History
The church is a medieval building. It has the tallest steeple of any medieval parish church in Britain. It also confirms it as one of the very finest medieval steeples in the country

The chancel and nave were re-built between 1430 and 1440. The building of the tower probably commenced in the 1440s or 1450s and was completed to its present height by 1499. Work began on the spire in 1501 and it was not finished until 1515. The weathercock was placed on the top of the spire amongst great rejoicing on the eve of Holy Cross Day, Thursday, 13 September 1515. This 'wedercoke' had been made in Lincoln from a huge copper basin captured from the Scots at the Battle of Flodden in 1513. It was bought in York by Thomas Tayleyor, one of the churchwardens at St. James. The total cost of the spire alone was £305 8s 4d,.

The church is mainly 15th century and is the third building on the site, replacing 11th- and 13th-century buildings. Originally the church had five subsidiary chapels and altars and a three-storey rood screen.

In October 1536, as a result of Henry VIII's ecclesiastical changes, people gathered in the church to start the Lincolnshire Rising, which was followed by the Pilgrimage of Grace. Neither succeeded and the church was stripped of its riches, including the rood screen, by the king's forces. 

The nave roof was replaced in 1825. The spire was restored between 1844 and 1845 by Lewis Nockalls Cottingham. 

A further restoration took place between 1861 and 1869 by James Fowler, known as 'Fowler of Louth'. The clerestories and arcades were cleaned and underpinned. A new south porch was erected. The church was refitted with open seats of oak; the Corporation stalls being of the same material. The floors were laid with Minton tiles, designed by the architect. A new heating system by Hayden and Son of Trowbridge was installed with the boiler in a newly constructed vault. A stained glass window, the gift of J. L. Fytche, was fixed on the east end of the south aisle. Another window, by Clayton and Bell, was to be placed at the west end of the north aisle, in memory of General Sir George Patey. The total cost of the works was around £6,000. The church was re-opened on 5 August 1869 in the presence of the Bishop of Lincoln.

In 1937, the church flew the highest flag in Lincolnshire to mark the coronation of George VI. Later that year, renovation work commenced on the spire, under the supervision of architect Mr. Goddard, who had previously worked on Lincoln Cathedral.

In 2015 researchers discovered two pieces of a pre-Conquest standing Stone Cross, dating to c950, in the Rectory garden. In form the Cross is of the 'ring' or 'wheel head' type, the central design being of Christ crucified. This type is more commonly seen today in Ireland. The Cross and its implications for the archaeology, history and the early church in Louth are discussed in a major article by Everson and Stocker, "{'}The Cros in the Markitte Stede'. The Louth Cross, its Monastery and its Town." (Medieval Archaeology Journal, vol. 61/2, 2017). The Louth Cross is on display within the church and a small booklet about it is available at the gift shop.

In 2017 funding was raised to fit a viewing door to the cell just below the spire floor. It holds the original medieval treadwheel that was used to haul up the stone and mortar for construction of the spire (1501-1515). Substantial records exist in the churchwardens' accounts from 1501 onward for the construction and use of the wheel, which was to become known as The Wild Mare. A small booklet about this rare survival is available from the church gift shop.

Dedication
The church is dedicated to St. James, son of Zebedee. In the Middle Ages, this saint was the focus of a major pilgrimage route to Santiago de Compostela in Spain.

Incumbents

Vicars

1200 Jordan, Priest
1247 Herueus (Harvey)
1276 Gilbert de Tetilthorp
1278 Master Richard de Welleton, Chaplain
1294 William de Leycton
1328 Robert de Foston, Deacon
1345 John de Waynflet
1349 Thomas de Kele
1368 Robert de Bloxham
1369 John de Harhill
      Simon Waynflete (over 20 years)
1421 Thomas Gedeney (Gednay) (20 years)
1443–44 Master John Sudbury
1461–62 Dom. Thomas Sudbury
1502 Master Richard Barnyngham (Bernyngham)
1514 Master Thomas Egleston
1527 Master George Thomson
1534 Master Thomas Kendall
1537 Geoffrey Baily (Baylie)
1549 John Louth
1558–59 Robert Doughty
1600 James Calfhill
1601 Alexander Cooke
1604 John Melton (still signing registers in 1636)
     Richard Smith
1630 Paul Glisson
1654 Henry Gray
1656 Henry Daile
Francis Castillion
1668 Samuel Adcock
1671 William Wetherell
     Samuel Nicholls (not instituted)
1704 William Richardson
1711 Charles L'Oste
1730 Stephen Ashton
1764 Stephen Fytche
1780 Wolley Jolland
1831 Edward Reginald Mantell

Rectors
In 1859 the income of the vicarage was augmented by an Order in Council by amalgamating it with revenues of the associated canonry of Lincoln Cathedral, the benefice becoming a rectory in its own right.  The vicar in post became the new Rector of Louth and held the associated canonry from that point onwards.  During the 19th and early 20th centuries the parish was divided to create two new parishes, of which the Rector of Louth was the patron.  From 1928 the Rector of Louth was held together with the post of Rector of Welton le Wold.  In 1974 the benefice became part of a Team Ministry serving the newly created Parish of Louth which incorporated these parishes (St Michael's and Holy Trinity) with those of South and North Elkington, Keddington and Stewton.  Since that time the Rector of Louth has been Team Rector of the Team Ministry.

1859 Albert Sydney Wilde
1915 Arthur Duncan-Jones, later Vicar of St Mary's, Primrose Hill and Dean of Chichester
1916 Charles Lenton
1928 Humphrey Phillipps Walcot Burton
1952 Aidan Crawley Pulleine Ward
1969 Michael Edgar Adie, afterwards become Archdeacon of Lincoln and then Bishop of Guildford
1977 David William Owen
1993 Stephen Douglas Holdaway
2013 Nicholas James Watson Brown
2021 John Cameron Watt

Bells
There is a peal of eight bells. They were recast in 1726 by Daniel Hedderly. In 1798 the great bell was cracked when it was rung to celebrate Nelson's victory in the Battle of the Nile. They were rehung in 1957, and the treble and two were recast. They have subsequently been refurbished and rehung in 2022.

Tower clock
The clock in the tower was installed in 1846 and made by Benjamin Vulliamy. It had a pin-wheel dead-beat escapement, with an eight-day movement. It was expected to last 200 years before needing replacement, and was set going on 25 July 1846.

It was replaced in August 1901 by a clock made by Leonard Hall of Louth. It contained a double three-legged gravity escapement as invented by Edmund Beckett, 1st Baron Grimthorpe, and chimed the Westminster chimes every 15 minutes. The hour hammer weighs .

Organ
An organ accompanied the singing of the Te Deum at the consecration of the church in 1515. This organ had been brought some years before from Flanders. When this organ was worn out in 1531, it is recorded in the parish records:That the honest men of this towne of Louthe deshirying to have a good payr of organs, to the laude, prayse and honour of God, and the Hole, Holy Co’pany of heffen, made an assemble together for this purpose on a certayne daye; at which type Mr. Richard Taylor, preste and bachelor of laws, then abydyng w’tin the dyocess of Norwiche being p’sent, herying the good devoute mynds, and vertuouse intent of the said townesmen, wherin he was borne and brought up, offred for to cause them have a payr made of a c’nnyng man in Lyn, that should be exampled by a payre of the same making at Ely, who was called Mr. Blyton, which then had a singular Prayse, for the sum of xxii powndes, whereof he pr’mysed to giff thereto xi powndes: upon whiche promesse they accorded, insomuch that the said Mr. Taylor covennantyd and bargaynyd the organ to be made and brought to this towne, and set upon the north syde in the hihhe quere, on St Barnabe Eve, in the yere of oure Lorde, M.V. xxxj., &c., &c.A new organ by Gray & Davison costing £800 was opened on 17 December 1857 by Henry Smart. This organ was altered by Forster and Andrews in 1868/9. After a rebuild in 1911 by Norman and Beard, it now has 37 stops and three manuals and pedals.

Organists

 Joseph Hill 1768 - 1819 (formerly a pupil at Beverley Minster; about 30 years of age when he was appointed to Louth, presumably his first and only appointment. See also obit.)
John Hoyland 1819-1827 (previously organist of St James' Church, Sheffield)
William Hoyland 1829 - 1857 (son of John Hoyland)
George Dixon 1859 - 1865 (formerly organist at St Swithun's Church, East Retford, afterwards organist of St Wulfram's Church, Grantham)
George Henry Porter 1866 - 1897
Owen Menai Price 1897 - 1946
Harold Dexter 1946 - 1949 (later organist of Southwark Cathedral)
Dennis Townhill 1949 - 1956
William Pierce 1956 - 1960  (returned to Australia)
Michael Nicholas 1960 - 1964
Michael John Smith 1965 - 1966 (later organist of Llandaff Cathedral)
Peter Burness 1966 - 1996
Frederic Goodwin 1996 - 2009
Keith Morgan 2009 - 2011
Lisa Taylor 2011-2015
Allan Smith 2014–present (Master of the Choristers)
Phil Hotham 2016–present (Organist)

Assistant organists

Albert Sharman ca.1905
Roger Harrison 1999 - 2011

Visiting and tourism
St James is nominated a "Cascade Church" within the Lincolnshire Church Tourism Network, an ecumenical scheme which promotes visits to and understanding of Lincolnshire's many churches. Like other Cascade churches it is stewarded on weekdays and there are guides available until 16:00. The western end of the church now has a tea shop, book shop and toilets, as well as information leading to other churches in the East Lindsey area.

Gallery

References

Church of England church buildings in Lincolnshire
Louth
Louth, Lincolnshire